Pelowaince (pronounced as Peelo-Vaince), "Peelowains" or "Pilowains" is a village and one of the 51 Union Councils (administrative subdivisions) of Khushab District (in Tehsil Noorpur Thal) in the Punjab Province of Pakistan.

People 

This village is called the land of judges and position holders. Mostly in every year, the village students are awarded positions in the Board exams and in past many have secured positions in Matric, Intermediate, Bachelors and other University level exams. Currently, many are serving the nation on honourable posts such as Judges, CSP officers, Doctors, Accountants, Professors, in Education department, Land revenue department, Agriculture department, Police department, FIA, SECP, HEC, FBR, Customs, etc.

The notable resident caste of Pelowaince are Bingi and Jasra including its sub-caste variants Khabba and Rathore. Other castes include Bloach, Angra, Mangat, Sial, Dhudhi Rajputs, Kohawar, etc. All castes hold land and are engaged in agriculture. Although the village lies in a backward area of Thal Desert, it stands out tall having good standard of life and education due to its hardworking people.

Historically, these people are famous for their self respect and freedom of action (as also recorded in the chronicles of British Raj police records). In politics, the village has fielded at different times its own candidates for National, Provincial and District Assembly. In religion, these people are away from superstitions and love to practise straight Islam.

References 

Union councils of Khushab District
Populated places in Khushab District